The Day of the Shining Star is a public holiday in North Korea falling on 16 February, the anniversary of the birth of the country's second leader, Kim Jong-il. Along with the Day of the Sun, the birthday of his father Kim Il-sung, it is the most important public holiday in the country.

Kim Jong-il was born in 1941 (Juche 30) in the Soviet Union, although North Korean propaganda says the date is 16 February 1942 (Juche 31) and places the birth at the Mount Paektu area in Korea. His birthday became an official holiday in 1982 when he began his work in the Politburo of the Workers' Party of Korea. He celebrated his birthdays privately. In 2012, the year following his death, the holiday was renamed the Day of the Shining Star.

The most lavish observances take place in the capital Pyongyang and include mass gymnastics, music performances, fireworks displays, military demonstrations, and mass dancing parties. The North Korean people receive more food rations and electricity than usual on the Day of the Shining Star.

Background

Kim Jong-il was born in February 1941 to Kim Il-sung and Kim Jong-suk in Siberia in the Russian Federal Republic, Soviet Union where his father had been in exile because of his guerrilla activities. North Korean propaganda dates Kim Jong-il's birth to 16 February 1942 and locates it at the Mount Paektu area in Korea, the mythical place of origin of the Korean people, where Kim Il-sung supposedly ran a guerrilla camp. The guerrillas were based in Manchuria at the time and Kim himself had been to the Soviet Far East before and after Kim Jong-il's birth.

In North Korean propaganda, Kim Jong-il is often associated with the image of the star. He is most often referred to as the "bright star", although the "shining star" is also used. According to legend, a bright star appeared on the sky the night he was born, and guerrilla fighters carved messages on trees(called guhonamu(구호나무)) proclaiming: "Three Heroes Shining in Korea with the Spirit of Mount Paekdu: Kim Il Sung, Kim Chŏng-suk, and Kwangmyŏngsŏng ('The Bright Star')" and "Oh! Korea! The Paekdu Star Was Born!"

History
Kim's birthday had been provisionally celebrated from 1976 on, but it became a national holiday only in 1982, two days after he became a member of the Politburo of the Workers' Party of Korea. When he ascended to the leadership of the country, his birthday was marked as "The Spring of Humanity" on the North Korean calendar. Kim shunned public occasions on his birthdays. The anniversary received its present name in 2012, the year following his death, when the Politburo announced that: "February 16, the greatest auspicious holiday of the nation when the great leader Comrade Kim Jong Il was born, will be instituted as the Day of the Shining Star". An equestrian statue with Kim Jong-il and Kim Il-sung was revealed to commemorate the day.

On 12 February 2013, North Korea conducted its third nuclear test a few days before the Day of the Shining Star in celebration of it.

Celebration

The holiday begins on 16 February and lasts for two days. Celebrations are observed throughout the country. The capital, Pyongyang, has observances such as mass gymnastics, music performances, fireworks displays, military demonstrations, and mass dancing parties. Boulevards are lined up with flags and banners. Millions of people visit the Kumsusan Palace of the Sun where both Kim Il-sung and Kim Jong-il lay in state. Exhibitions of the bloom Kimjongilia take place. The plant, a hybrid begonia, is named after Kim and has been cultivated to bloom around the Day of the Shining Star. The North Korean government often allocates more food and energy to the people on Day of the Shining Star than they normally receive. Children are given candy, and it is one of the few occasions on which new members are admitted to the Korean Children's Union. Vitaly Mansky's 2015 documentary film Under the Sun chronicles the run-up to such a ceremony on the Day of the Shining Star.

Government and business offices, banks, and retail outlets close for its observance. Weddings are commonly held on this day.

The two-month period between the Day of the Shining Star and the Day of the Sun is known as the Loyalty Festival Period and festivities occur throughout. On the calendar, the Day of the Shining Star takes place after the Generalissimo Day (대원수추대일,14 February, commemorating Kim Jong-il's accession to the rank of Taewonsu) and before the International Women's Day (8 March). The Day of the Shining Star is one of three days celebrating Kim Jong-il on the calendar, the other two being the Generalissimo Day and the Day of Songun (25 August, commemorating the beginning of Kim's Songun, or army-first, leadership).

See also

Kwangmyŏngsŏng program
North Korean cult of personality
Public holidays in North Korea

References

Citations

Works cited

External links
Day of the Shining Star  at Naenara
2014 photos at CNN
2016 photos at NewsOK

1982 establishments in North Korea
Anniversaries
Annual events in North Korea
Birthdays of heads of state
February observances
Kim Jong-il
Public holidays in North Korea
Winter events in North Korea